The Dr. Robert H. Goddard Memorial Trophy is awarded annually to an individual or group determined to have made the most impact on space activities over the past year. It is named after Robert Goddard, the father of modern rocketry. It is the primary award of the National Space Club presented during the Dr. Robert H. Goddard Memorial Dinner in Washington, D.C.

List of award winners

References

External links
National Space Club

Science and technology awards